Soteldo is a surname. Notable people with the surname include:
Angelo Yonnier Lucena Soteldo (born 2003), Venezuelan footballer
Yeferson Soteldo (born 1997), Venezuelan footballer